Sagocoris is a genus of true bugs belonging to the family Naucoridae.

The species of this genus are found in Australia.

Species:

Sagocoris asymmetricus 
Sagocoris biroi 
Sagocoris flavinotum 
Sagocoris gressitti 
Sagocoris intermedius 
Sagocoris irianus 
Sagocoris lariversae

References

Naucoridae